Aneswaram Siva temple is at Chemmappilly, the western area of Thrissur District. Its main Deity is Shiva. This was owned by a Namboothiri illam. Now it is one of the several temples governed by the Cochin Devaswom Board, an autonomous body constructed by Government of Kerala to manage the temples. Every year Vavu bali is conducted here ( A tribute to ancestors)

Location
Chemmappilly is a village near to Thriprayar Temple. In former time this was a "Keezhedam" managed by Thriprayar Temple. Chemmappilly is about 24 km away from Guruvayoor's Sri Krishna temple and 25 km away from Irinjalakuda temple and   Kodungallur is 24 km away. The nearest railhead is Thrissur, 24 km east of the temple. From Thriprayar it takes three kilometres to reach. This temple is very near to Sreeraman chira, where Sethubandhanam took place every year in memory of those in Ramayan.

Details
Main deity of this temple is Loard Siva. 
The main deity facing to west. Just opposite to this temple there is a pond and paddy field. Ancestors telling that the idol facing to water is more powerful. Thanthri of this temple is Brahmasree Tharananelloor Padmanabhan Namboothirippad, who is also the Thanthri of Thriprayar Sreeramaswami Temple.

Pooja
Two poojas are observed daily. Opening time Morning 630am. Evening 6pm . Closing time Morning 9am. Evening 7pm.

Festivals
The main festival is Maha Sivarathri. 
Sreekrishna Jayanthi is also celebrated in this temple. Lot of devotees reaches here at the evening to participate the procession.
The Malayalam month "Karkkadakam" is celebrated here with various programs. Ramayan Ekaha yagna, Puranic quiz, daily Chanting of Ramayan, Ganapathi Havanam are also performed.

Thriprayar and Aneswaram Temples
During the "Grama pradakshinam" of Thriprayar Thevar at the time of Arattupuzha Devamela, Thevar ran away from Aneswaram Siva, without any sound because thevar borrowed paddy and coconut from Lord Aneswaram Siva. This conducts on the fifth day of the Gramapradakshinam. After the pooram at Punnappilly mana (Temple Ooralan) on the way to Muttichoor kottaram this occurs.

References

Shiva temples in Kerala